My Grandfather, The Cubist is an album by Joy Electric. Ronnie Martin has stated in a Q&A on the Joy Electric website that it is much more minimal than his previous albums, and the closest album sound that he can compare it to is Melody.

Track listing
 "Victorian Intuition / Father Winter Replies" - 5:10
 "Rudimentary Animation" - 4:07
 "Draw for Me, M.C. Escher" - 4:02
 "Four Gone Pierre (or What Electricity Made)" - 3:12
 "The First Time I Loved Her It Was Here" - 5:01
 "I Recall the Telephone Booth" - 4:00
 "On Being Principally Utopian" - 4:28
 "Whether by Horse, or Horseless" - 4:03
 "Only Copernicus" - 4:33
 "Prelude to Cubism" - 1:09
 "My Grandfather, the Cubist" - 4:00
 "Cubism Interlude" - 2:10

Credits
Ronnie Martin – Vocals, Minimoog Voyager Synthesizer

2008 albums
Joy Electric albums
Tooth & Nail Records albums